Highland Township is a township in Wapello County, Iowa, USA.

History
Highland Township was organized in 1848.

References

Townships in Wapello County, Iowa
Townships in Iowa